Princess Pauline Friederike Marie of Württemberg, full German name: Pauline Friederike Marie, Prinzessin von Württemberg (25 February 1810, Stuttgart, Kingdom of Württemberg – 7 July 1856, Wiesbaden, Duchy of Nassau) was a member of the House of Württemberg and a Princess of Württemberg by birth. Through her marriage to William, Duke of Nassau, Pauline was also a Duchess consort of Nassau. Pauline is an ancestress of the present Belgian, Danish, Dutch, Luxembourgish, Norwegian, and Swedish Royal families. She was a maternal first cousin of Princess Alexandra of Saxe-Altenburg, as well as her paternal second cousin. Via that link, those six people (Frederick II Eugene, Princess Friedrike of Branderburg-Schewedt, Ernest Frederick III, Princess Ernestine, Charles II and Princess Friedrike of Hesse-Darmstradt), are ancestors of almost every single royal family in Europe (exceptions being Liechtenstein and Monaco).

Early life
Pauline was the fourth child of Prince Paul of Württemberg and his wife Princess Charlotte of Saxe-Hildburghausen.

Marriage and issue
Pauline married William, Duke of Nassau, eldest son of Frederick William, Prince of Nassau-Weilburg and his wife, Burgravine Louise Isabelle of Kirchberg, and widower of her aunt Louise on 23 April 1829 in Stuttgart. William is third cousin of Pauline's father,  Prince Paul of Württemberg (both are great-great-grandsons of King George II of Great Britain), which makes them third cousins, once removed. Pauline and William had four children:

 An unnamed daughter (Biebrich, 27 April 1830 – Biebrich, 28 April 1830).
 Princess Helene Wilhelmine Henriette Pauline Marianne of Nassau (Wiesbaden, 12 April 1831 – Bad Pyrmont, 27 October 1888), married in Wiesbaden on 26 September 1853 George Victor, Prince of Waldeck and Pyrmont, and had issue.
 Prince Nikolaus Wilhelm of Nassau (20 September 1832 – 17 September 1905). Married, morganatically, Natalia Alexandrovna Pushkina, Countess of Merenberg. She was a daughter of Alexander Pushkin and his wife Natalya Goncharova. They had issue, now extinct in male line.
 Princess Sophia Wilhelmine Marianne Henriette of Nassau (9 July 1836 – 30 December 1913). Married Oscar II of Sweden. The present Belgian, Danish, Norwegian and Swedish royal families descend from this marriage.

Ancestry

|-

|-

1810 births
1856 deaths
House of Nassau-Weilburg
Nobility from Stuttgart
Princesses of Württemberg